Jorge Delgado (born 5 January 1954) is an Ecuadorian former swimmer who competed in the 1972 Summer Olympics and in the 1976 Summer Olympics. and President of the Ecuadorian National Olympic Committee (ECU)

On September 4, 2021, is elected President of the Ecuadorian National Olympic Committee (ECU).

References

1954 births
Living people
Ecuadorian male swimmers
Ecuadorian male freestyle swimmers
Male butterfly swimmers
Male medley swimmers
Olympic swimmers of Ecuador
Swimmers at the 1971 Pan American Games
Swimmers at the 1972 Summer Olympics
Swimmers at the 1975 Pan American Games
Swimmers at the 1976 Summer Olympics
Pan American Games gold medalists for Ecuador
Pan American Games bronze medalists for Ecuador
Pan American Games medalists in swimming
Medalists at the 1971 Pan American Games
Medalists at the 1975 Pan American Games
20th-century Ecuadorian people